Red Mountain is a mountain summit on the divide of the Diablo Range in Santa Clara County, California.  It lies at the northeastern edge of San Antonio Valley, along the border with Stanislaus County, California.

See also
List of highest points in California by county

References

External links
 

Diablo Range
Mountains of Santa Clara County, California
Mountains of the San Francisco Bay Area
Mountains of Northern California